Edward Alcock may refer to:

 Edward Alcock (artist) (fl. 1745–1778), English painter of portraits and miniatures
 Edward Alcock (footballer) (1914–1939), English footballer for Tranmere Rovers and Congleton Town